Delia is a city in Jackson County, Kansas, United States.  As of the 2020 census, the population of the city was 151.

History
Delia was laid out and platted in 1905. Its founder, David Cunningham, named the town in honor of his mother, Delia Cunningham.

The first post office in Delia was established in January 1906.

Geography
Delia is located at  (39.239321, -95.964543).

Demographics

Delia is part of the Topeka, Kansas Metropolitan Statistical Area.

2010 census
As of the census of 2010, there were 169 people, 52 households, and 40 families residing in the city. The racial makeup of the city was 85.8% White, 10.7% Native American, and 3.6% from two or more races. Hispanic or Latino of any race were 1.8% of the population.

There were 52 households, of which 48.1% had children under the age of 18 living with them, 65.4% were married couples living together, 5.8% had a female householder with no husband present, 5.8% had a male householder with no wife present, and 23.1% were non-families. 15.4% of all households were made up of individuals, and 7.7% had someone living alone who was 65 years of age or older. The average household size was 3.25 and the average family size was 3.68.

The median age in the city was 33.5 years. 30.8% of residents were under the age of 18; 7.7% were between the ages of 18 and 24; 26% were from 25 to 44; 26.6% were from 45 to 64; and 8.9% were 65 years of age or older. The gender makeup of the city was 46.2% male and 53.8% female.

2000 census
As of the census of 2000, there were 179 people, 53 households, and 46 families residing in the city. The racial makeup of the city was 86.03% White, 12.85% Native American, and 1.12% from two or more races. Hispanic or Latino of any race were 0.56% of the population.

There were 53 households, out of which 47.2% had children under the age of 18 living with them, 73.6% were married couples living together, 7.5% had a female householder with no husband present, and 13.2% were non-families. 13.2% of all households were made up of individuals, and 5.7% had someone living alone who was 65 years of age or older. The average household size was 3.38 and the average family size was 3.72.

In the city, the population was spread out, with 38.5% under the age of 18, 6.7% from 18 to 24, 24.0% from 25 to 44, 20.1% from 45 to 64, and 10.6% who were 65 years of age or older. The median age was 30 years. For every 100 females, there were 113.1 males. For every 100 females age 18 and over, there were 103.7 males.

The median income for a household in the city was $36,667, and the median income for a family was $37,250. Males had a median income of $29,375 versus $43,750 for females. The per capita income for the city was $14,665. About 11.7% of families and 12.8% of the population and 11.7% of families were below the poverty line, including 17.1% of those under the age of 18 and 24.0% of those 65 and older.

Education
The community is served by Kaw Valley USD 321 public school district.

Notable people

 David Bawden, sedevacantist claimant to the papacy as “Pope Michael”.

References

Further reading

External links
 Delia - Directory of Public Officials
 Delia city map, KDOT

Cities in Kansas
Cities in Jackson County, Kansas
Topeka metropolitan area, Kansas